Jean-Pierre Cot (born 23 October 1937 in Geneva, Switzerland) is a French jurist who has served as a judge at the International Tribunal for the Law of the Sea.

Biography 
He is the son of Pierre Cot, also a politician and minister.

After studying law at Sorbonne University in Paris from 1955 to 1965, he earned a Ph.D. in 1966. He then was professor of public law and international law at the University of Amiens, then the University of Paris I, before being elected as a deputy for Savoie in 1973. He was later re-elected, before joining the Socialist government of Pierre Mauroy in 1981 as deputy minister in charge of Co-operation and Development.

He was a Member of European Parliament (MEP) in 1978–1979 and 1984–1999, and chaired the socialist group of the European Parliament between 1989 and 1994, before becoming its vice-president in 1997.

Since 2002, he has been a member of the International Tribunal for the Law of the Sea.

In 2017, he was made an officer of the legion of honour.

References

External links 
 ITLOS - Judge Jean-Pierre Cot Biography at the website of the ITLOS

1937 births
Living people
French judges of United Nations courts and tribunals
International Tribunal for the Law of the Sea judges
MEPs for France 1958–1979
MEPs for France 1984–1989
MEPs for France 1989–1994
MEPs for France 1994–1999
Academic staff of Pantheon-Sorbonne University
Lawyers from Geneva
Socialist Party (France) MEPs
University of Paris alumni